The French Far East Expeditionary Corps (CEFEO) was a colonial expeditionary force of the French Union Army that was initially formed in French Indochina in 1945 during the Pacific War. The CEFEO later fought and lost in the First Indochina War against the Viet Minh rebels.

The CEFEO was largely made up of voluntarily-enlisted indigenous tirailleurs from the French Union colonial or protectorate territories, one exception being the French Foreign Legion, which consisted mainly of volunteers from Europe and the rest of the world. Metropolitan conscripts did not serve in the CEFEO unless they volunteered to do so. Less than half of the total personnel of the Corps were French professional soldiers, mostly serving with paratrooper, artillery and other specialist units.

History

Composition

The CEFEO was largely made up of voluntarily-enlisted indigenous tirailleurs from the French Union colonial or protectorate territories in the Northwest Africa Maghreb (Morocco, Algeria and Tunisia), sub-Saharan Africa, Madagascar, and South-East Asia.  An exception was the French Foreign Legion which consisted mainly of European volunteers.

In 1954, CEFEO included 177,000 men, including 59,000 indigenous people. Colonial soldiers made up the bulk of the ground forces. Between 1947 and 1954, 122,900 North Africans and 60,340 Black Africans landed in Indochina, or 183,240 Africans in total. On February 1, 1954, they represented 43.5% of the 127,785 men of the ground forces (excluding indigenous Vietnamese). Most of the professional airborne units (BPC) and the entire Chief of Staff were metropolitan French, as were some artillery and specialist units.

From September 1945 to the cease-fire in July 1954, a total of 488,560 men and women served in Indochina:

223,467 French from metropolitan France
122,920 Algerians, Tunisians and Moroccans
72,833 Foreign Legionnaires (including Germans, Italians, Spaniards, Hungarians, Poles, Ukrainians, Czechs and numerous other nationalities)
60,340 Sub-Saharan Africans

In early November 1953, the French U.N. volunteers returning from the ended Korean War joined the French Union CEFEO and sailed from Incheon to Vietnam. They would be later involved in the battle of Mang Yang Pass of June and July 1954.

Pacific War (1945)

The CEFEO was created in early 1945 as a replacement for the older Far East French Expeditionary Forces (Forces Expéditionnaires Françaises d'Extrême-Orient, FEFEO). Its purpose was to support Saigon-based General Gabriel Sabattier, divisional commander of colonial "Indochina French Forces" (Forces Françaises d'Indochine) and Free French Forces resistance small groups C.L.I. then fighting with the Japanese Southern Expeditionary Army Group during the March coup. After the 1944 Liberation of France and the fall of Nazi Germany in Europe the following year, the French authorities wanted to "free" the last Axis powers occupied territories in Southeast Asia, these included the newly established Empire of Vietnam, which was a Japanese colony. On June 7, 1945, Leclerc was nominated commander of the CEFEO. On June 22, Leclerc transferred command of the 2nd Armored Division (2ème D.B.) -the famous unit which had liberated Paris in August 1944- to Colonel Dio. Leclerc received command of the Far East French Forces (Forces Françaises en Extrême-Orient) on August 15.

First Indochina War (1946–1954)

In 1946, nationalist, then communist popular rebellion movement rose up against established colonial rule in the French Indochina federation then including Laos, Cambodia, Tonkin (North Vietnam), the Annam (Middle Vietnam) and Cochinchina (South Vietnam), all states being protectorates excluding the latter which was a colony with Saigon as its capital. In 1946, they would become associated states within the French Union and by 1949 Tonkin, Annam and the Republic of Cochin China would merge as the State of Vietnam. The communist Viet Minh led by Ho Chi Minh overwhelmed its rival nationalist movements and organized itself as a guerilla army using guerrilla warfare, then in the 1950s support—using conventional warfare. The First Indochina War officially lasted from November 20, 1946 until July 20, 1954 and was settled by the Geneva Agreements.

Dissolution (1956)
After withdrawal of the last CEFEO troops from the independent Vietnam, Laos and Cambodia in 1956, the corps was disbanded by General Pierre Jacquot.

Commanders

Philippe Leclerc de Hauteclocque (1945–46)
Jean Etienne Valluy (1946–48)
Roger Blaizot (1948–49)
Marcel Carpentier (1949–50)
Jean de Lattre de Tassigny (1950–51)
Raoul Salan (1952–53)
Henri Navarre (1953–54)
Paul Ély (1954–55)
Pierre Jacquot (1955–56)

Far East Forces

North West Operation Group (Groupe d'Opération Nord-Ouest, GONO) 

Commander: General Christian de Castries (1954)

Far East Ground Forces (Forces Terrestres en Extrême-Orient, FTEO)

North Vietnam Ground Forces (Forces Terrestres du Nord Vietnam, FTNV) 

Commander: General René Cogny (1954)

South Vietnam Ground Forces (Forces Terrestres du Sud Vietnam, FTSV) 
Among the French ground forces in the Far East was the 6th Engineers Regiment (6 RG).

Far East Naval Forces (Forces Maritimes en Extrême-Orient, FMEO) 

Commanders:
 Georges Thierry d'Argenlieu (1946–47)
 Emile Bollaert (1947)
 Vice-Admiral Auboyneau (1952–54)

Far East Naval Directorate (Direction Navale d'Extrême-Orient, DNEO) 

Commander: Contre-Admiral Bosvieux (1952)

Far East Air Forces (Forces Aériennes en Extrême-Orient, FAEO) 
Among the aircraft supplied to the French in Indochina in 1950-51 were B-26 Marauders that went to Bomber Group 1/25 Tunisie, B-26 Invaders, P-63 Kingcobras, C-47 Dakotas that went to Transport Group 1/64, 2/64, 2/63 which had both C-47s and C-119 Packets (but these were only operated by US civilian pilots of Civil Air Transport), former U.S. Navy F6F Hellcats that went to 11th Carrier Assault Flotilla (on Arromanches until April 30, 1954), SB-2C Helldivers that went to 3rd Carrier Assault Flotilla (on Arromanches until April 30, 1954), F8F-1B Bearcats that went to Groupe de Chasse (Fighter Group) 1/22 Saintonge and Group de Chasse 2/22 Languedoc, PB4Y2 Privateers that went to the 28th Bomber Flotilla, and F4U Corsairs that went to 14th Carrier Fighter Flotilla (on Belleau Wood on May 1, 1954).

At the beginning of April 1954, Lt. General Earle E. ("Pat") Partridge, Commander of the U. S. Far East Air Force (FEAF), had arrived in Saigon and begun talks with his French counterpart, Gen. Lauzin, as well as with Gen. Navarre. He had brought with him Brigadier General Joseph D. Caldara, then the chief of the FEAF Bomber Command—the man who would fly and command the "Vulture" missions (bombing the area around Dien Bien Phu with 98 B-29 Superfortresses). The Americans had arrived at Saigon's Tan Son Nhut Airport in a discreet B-17, so as not to alert hostile eyes to the unfamiliar configuration of the B-29 Superfortress. From the beginning, the Americans were appalled at the total lack of French preparedness for anything like the control of a major saturation bombardment operation. French Col. Brohon later said that this project involved the use of "several A-bombs" in the Dien Bien Phu area.

Caldara decided to judge the situation for himself. On April 4, 1954, in the dead of the night, he flew his B-17 with an American crew over the valley of Dien Bien Phu, repeated the mission later with a French C-47 Dakota; and then once more with the B-17. The overall plan was simple enough; the two wings of B-29s from Okinawa and the one from Clark Air Base would rendezvous east of the Laotian capital of Vientiane, head for their target; and exit from Indochina via the Gulf of Tonkin. The French at the highest levels seemed to have no idea of the power of the 98 Superfortresses. This bombing mission was never approved as Winston Churchill was against it. Late that month on 29 April 1954 C-124 Globemasters from the 322nd Air Division were in the process of air-lifting into Indochina the brand-new 7th BPC (Bataillon de Parachutistes Coloniaux), en route from Europe to Vietnam via Colombo, Ceylon. Thus U. S. Air Force aircraft and personnel were actively involved in Vietnam in 1954.

Notable personnel
Jacques Massu (10e DP)
Marcel Bigeard (6e BPC)
Roger Trinquier (GCMA)
Jean Sassi (GCMA)
Pierre Schoendoerffer (SCA)
Raoul Coutard (SPI)
Mohamed Oufkir

See also
First Indochina War
French Union
Vietnamese National Army

References

External links
CEFEO uniforms 
Indochina Order of Battle, 1 February 1942
 FEFO French resistance in Indochina (1943-1945)
 Veterans federation website
 CEFEO evolution (French Defense archives)
 CEFEO train 

Corps of France
Military units and formations of the First Indochina War
Military units and formations of the Cold War
Military units and formations established in 1945
Military units and formations disestablished in 1956
Expeditionary units and formations